David Roger Bryan Dean (16 March 1943 – 3 August 2008) was a British guitar player and teacher. He took piano lessons at the age of 7, moving on to guitar at 10. He then had musical training at the Eric Gilder School in London with teacher Ivor Mairants. His professional career ran over 40 years until he retired following a car crash in 2004. During the 1960s he played in a number of bands that left few traces in the history of popular music. The notable exception occurred when he briefly joined John Mayall's Bluesbreakers. Dean's guitar is heard on Mayall's first album, John Mayall Plays John Mayall, and first single. Leaving Mayall, he worked with his former band the Nu Notes. In 1971, he played with a band called Spike Island and recorded an album with them, a mixture of folk, country and world music. Later, as a member of various other bands like The Bluejays, P. P. Arnold's backing band and The Bad Boys, he recorded on some hits, but gradually turned to more anonymous work as a session musician playing for TV shows, backing stars and other lucrative jobs, such as cruises on the QE2 as guitarist with the Joe Loss Orchestra. In 1978, Dean became the first Western musician allowed to play electric guitar in China. From 1992 he held teaching posts at various British schools. After a serious illness, Dean died in 2008.

Discography 
 1964 : Crocodile Walk/When I'm Gone Single on Decca Records by John Mayall's Bluesbreakers.
 1965 : John Mayall Plays John Mayall by John Mayall's Bluesbreakers Album Live at Klooks Kleek, 7/12/64. 
 1968 : So Many Roads by John Mayall's Bluesbreakers – Compilation – Roger Dean guitar on 3 songs.
 1969 : Looking Back by John Mayall's Bluesbreakers – Compilation – Roger guitar on one song, Blues City Shakedown. 
 1971 : Thru The Years by John Mayall's Bluesbreakers – Compilation – Roger guitar on one song, My Baby Is Sweeter
 1971 : Spike Island by Spike Island 
 1971 : Wild Angels/Six Chevaux Blancs (John Hill) by Eddy Orini – Single on Evasion Records
 1972 : Down The Line by John Mayall – Compilation
 1972 : New Orleans / In a moment of madness Harley Quinne – Bell Records BELL 1255 – Roger left the band after he was made to dress as an Elf on Top of the Pops – Listen
 1973 : When Will I See You Again and Year of Decision by The Three Degrees – Singles 
 1974 : The Beginning Vol. 13 by John Mayall – Compilation 
 1976 : J K All the way by Jonathan King 
 1979 : O Cheryl/Ode to England by Manuel And Los Por Favors [Andrew Sachs] – Single by Andrew Sachs, iconic character in British comedy. 
 1980 : The Munch Bunch – Stories And Songs by Brian Wade 
 1981 : Rare Tracks Vol. 2 by John Mayall – Compilation – Roger guitar on Another Man Done Gone
 1982 : The Great British Blues, Barrelhouse And Boogie Bonanza 1962-1968 by Various Artists – Compilation featuring Alexis Korner's Blues Incorporated, Graham Bond Organisation, John Mayall's Bluesbreakers, Eddie Boyd And His Blues Band, Savoy Brown Blues Band, Ten Years After and John Mayall's Bluesbreakers* Featuring Eric Clapton. – Roger on one song, I Need Your Love
 1982 : Lorraine by Lorraine 
 1992 : London Blues 1964 – 1969 by John Mayall – Compilation – Roger on 3 songs

External links
 https://www.discogs.com/fr/John-Mayall-And-His-Bluesbreakers-Crocodile-Walk-When-Im-Gone/release/3198489
 https://www.discogs.com/fr/John-Mayall-John-Mayall-Plays-John-Mayall/release/5820550
 https://www.discogs.com/fr/artist/460795-Roger-Dean-2

1945 births
2008 deaths
English blues guitarists
English rock guitarists
English pop guitarists
English session musicians
English male guitarists
Deaths from brain cancer in the United Kingdom
People from Hendon
20th-century British guitarists
20th-century British male musicians